The Ahmad Yani class of six general-purpose frigates were acquired by the Indonesian Navy in the 1980s.

Operational history
In 1992, KRI Ki Hajar Dewantara, along with KRI Yos Sudarso and KRI Teluk Banten intercepted the Portuguese ship Lusitania Expresso in East Timor. Col. Widodo, deputy assistant of the Indonesian Navy´s Eastern Fleet, told Radio Republik Indonesia from aboard the Indonesian warship KRI Yos Sudarso that the ferry entered Indonesian waters at 5:28 a.m. local time on March 11, 1992. At 6:07, the Lusitania Expresso had traveled  into Indonesian territory and Captain Luis Dos Santos (Lusitania Expressos captain) was ordered to leave immediately. Col. Widodo said the Portuguese ship captain obeyed the order and turned his ship around and headed back to sea.

Ships

Modernisation
All six frigates have had their steam turbine power plants replaced with marine diesel engines.

The frigates of the Ahmad Yani class are due to be replaced by the s (SIGMA PKR 10514); the first of which, Raden Eddy Martadinata (331), was commissioned on 7 April 2017.

See also
 List of active Indonesian Navy ships
 Equipment of the Indonesian Navy

References 

Frigates of the Indonesian Navy
 
Frigate classes